Forcey is a commune in the Haute-Marne department in north-eastern France. It has a population of 64 (2017).

See also
Communes of the Haute-Marne department

References

Communes of Haute-Marne